These are the official results of the Men's 200 metres event at the 1999 IAAF World Championships in Seville, Spain. There were a total number of 72 participating athletes, with ten qualifying heats, four quarter-finals, two semi-finals and the final held on Friday 27 August 1999 at 20:00h.

Final
Frank Fredericks was forced to scratch from the final after he injured his hamstring while warming up.

Semi-final
Held on Wednesday 25 August 1999

Quarter-finals
Held on Saturday 21 August 1999

Heats
Held on Saturday 21 August 1999

References
 

H
200 metres at the World Athletics Championships